Thomas Daniel Hill (born 13 October 2002) is a dual qualified England, Wales and Republic of Ireland footballer who plays as a midfielder for Liverpool.

Career
Hill made his professional debut for Liverpool on 17 December 2019, starting in the away match against Aston Villa in the quarter-finals of the EFL Cup.
On 5 August 2020, Hill signed a contract extension with Liverpool.

In September 2020, Hill suffered a season-ending ACL injury; the next month, he signed a new long-term deal with Liverpool after turning 18.

International career
Born in England, Hill is of Irish and Welsh descent. On March 11 2022, he was called up by the Republic of Ireland national under-21 football team. On 14 March 2023 he was called up to the Wales national under-21 football team

Career statistics

Club

References

External links
 
 
 
 

2002 births
Living people
People from Formby
English footballers
English people of Irish descent
English people of Welsh descent
Association football midfielders
Liverpool F.C. players